Halford may refer to:

Placenames
Halford, Shropshire, England
Halford, Warwickshire, England
Halford Island, Nunavut, Canada

Other uses
 Halford (surname)
 Halford Mackinder (1861–1947), geographer, a founder of the study of geopolitics
 USS Halford (DD-480), US Navy ship named after William Halford
 Halford (band), heavy metal band featuring Rob Halford
 Halford baronets, baronetcies in the UK
 Halford Special, British racing car

See also
 Halfords - a British retailer
 Holford (disambiguation)